The color green has a number of traditional associations in Islam. In the Quran, it is associated with paradise. Green was adopted by the Shi'ites, and remains particularly popular in Shi'ite iconography, but it is also widely used in by Sunni states, notably in the flag of Saudi Arabia and the flag of Pakistan.

Quran 

Al-Khidr ("The Green One") is a Qur’anic figure who met and traveled with Moses.

The Green Dome, traditional site of the tomb of Muhammad, was painted green on the order of Sultan Abdul Hamid II (r. 1876–1909).

Islamic flags

Green flags were adopted by Shi'ites in the early Islamic period, although the most common Shi'a color was white, in symbolic opposition to Abbasid black. Thus in 817, when the Abbasid caliph al-Ma'mun adopted the Alid Ali al-Ridha a his heir-apparent, he also changed the dynastic color from black to green. The change was reverted al-Ma'mun had Ali killed, and returned to Baghdad in 819.

Today, green is also used in several national flags as a symbol of Islam. These include: Algeria, Azerbaijan, Comoros, Iran, Mauritania, Pakistan, Saudi Arabia, Sri Lanka, and Tajikistan. Some Arab countries also use pan-Arab colors, which include green. These include: Iraq, Jordan, Kuwait, Lebanon, Sudan, Syria, and the United Arab Emirates, as well as several contested states including Palestine, Somaliland, and Western Sahara. Libya formerly also followed this principle, featuring green as its only component color (at the time the only flag in the world to use only one color) until 2011.

There are also several flags of Muslim-majority countries featuring green color that does not symbolize Islam. Examples include Bangladesh, Turkmenistan, Uzbekistan, Guinea, Guinea-Bissau, Mali, and Senegal (in the latter four cases, the green color is a component of the pan-African colors, which are also adopted by even Christian-majority countries such as Malawi and South Sudan).

See also

 Shades of green
 Islamic flags
 List of Shia Muslims flags
 Symbols of Islam
 Pan-Arab colors

References

Bibliography
 
  Abdul-Matin, Ibrahim. “Green Deen: What Islam Teaches about Protecting the Planet.” Green 	Deen: What Islam Teaches about Protecting the Planet, Kube Publishing, 2012.

Islamic symbols
Color in religion